Sarophorus is a genus of dung beetles in the tribe Ateuchini (subfamily Scarabaeinae) of the family Scarabaeidae. It comprises about ten species from Africa.

Habitat
These dung beetles are found in both dense vegetation with shade, and cooler upland grasslands.

References

External links

Sarophorus in Insectoid.Info has a list of species.

Scarabaeinae